A Useful Life is a 2010 Uruguayan drama film about the love of film, directed by Federico Veiroj and shot in black-and-white. The film was selected as the Uruguayan entry for the Best Foreign Language Film at the 83rd Academy Awards but it did not make the final shortlist.

Plot
Set in Montevideo's legendary Cinemateca Uruguaya, it is the story about the closure of a cinematheque with the same name due to financial difficulties, and how it affects its film loving middle manager Jorge (played by film critic-turned-actor Jorge Jellinek), who has worked there for 25 years. At first he is overwhelmed by the prospect of having no profession or purpose, and drifts around in Montevideo. But eventually he realises that nothing can kill his love for film, so he ends the day by taking his love interest to the cinema.

Although the story is fiction, Cinemateca Uruguaya, which celebrated 50 years in 2012, is besieged by financial problems, and its director Manuel Martínez Carril agreed to play himself in the film.

Cast
 Jorge Jellinek as Jorge
 Manuel Martinez Carril as Martínez
 Paola Venditto as Paola

Awards
Istanbul Film Festival - Special Jury Prize ex-aequo
Havana Film Festival/New Latin American Cinema of La Havana - Coral Grand Prize, Best Film
Warsaw International Film Festival - Special Mention

See also
 List of submissions to the 83rd Academy Awards for Best Foreign Language Film
 List of Uruguayan submissions for the Academy Award for Best Foreign Language Film

References

External links

Indiwire: A Useful Life Linked 2013-10-25

2010 films
2010 drama films
Uruguayan black-and-white films
Films set in a movie theatre
Films set in Montevideo
Films shot in Uruguay
2010s Spanish-language films
Uruguayan drama films